Thomas Ong Thian Chai (born 1 February 1969) is a Singaporean actor, television host and businessman who films on an ad-hoc basis. An irregular employee of MediaCorp, he has joined and left the company several times to concentrate on other projects. More recently, he returned to MediaCorp for the fourth time and signed a three-year contract in early 2012.

Career
Ong was a flight steward with Singapore Airlines before entering the entertainment industry. He joined the newly formed Television Corporation of Singapore in 1994 and made his debut in Dr Justice. He won the Top 5 and Top 10 Most Popular Male Artistes award thrice in the 1990s. 

He left and returned to MediaCorp several times to concentrate on other projects. More recently he returned to MediaCorp for the fourth time and signed a three-year contract in early 2012.

In January 2020, Ong announced his retirement from the entertainment industry.

Filmography

Awards and nominations

References

External links
Profile on xin.msn.com

1969 births
Singaporean people of Chinese descent
Singaporean male television actors
Singaporean television personalities
Living people
20th-century Singaporean male actors
21st-century Singaporean male actors